Silko Günzel (born 2 June 1971) is a retired German freestyle swimmer who specialized in short course (25 m pool) sprint swimming disciplines, in which he won eight European medals between 1991 and 1994.

He originates from East Germany. After retiring from swimming in 1996 he worked as a software developer and doctor in physiotherapy and health care related fields. Between 2000 and 2010, he founded three medical consulting companies: Airnergy AG, Medical Biophysics GmbH and Günzel Medical Consulting & Development UG.

Publications
Silko Günzel "Apparatus and process for the generation of fluid activated by singlet oxygen", US Patent 20090202399, Filing date: March 17, 2007

References

1971 births
Living people
German male swimmers
German male freestyle swimmers
European Aquatics Championships medalists in swimming
20th-century German people
21st-century German people